Selahattin Kınalı (born 15 May 1978) is a former Turkish professional footballer. He played for several clubs in Turkey, scoring 64 goals in 278 matches.

Personal life
Kınalı is distantly related to the Turkish footballer Safa Kınalı.

References

1978 births
Living people
Turkish footballers
Turkey under-21 international footballers
Süper Lig players
Gümüşhanespor footballers
Trabzonspor footballers
Antalyaspor footballers
Akçaabat Sebatspor footballers
Karşıyaka S.K. footballers
Denizlispor footballers
People from Araklı
Mediterranean Games silver medalists for Turkey
Competitors at the 1997 Mediterranean Games
Association football forwards
Mediterranean Games medalists in football